The following is a list of notable events and releases of the year 1996 in Norwegian music.

Events

March
 29 – The 23rd Vossajazz started in Voss, Norway (March 29 – 31).

May
 22 – The 24th Nattjazz started in Bergen, Norway (May 22 – June 2).

July
 15 – The 36th Moldejazz started in Molde, Norway (July 15 – 20).

Albums released

 March
 25 – Visible World (ECM Records), by Jan Garbarek

Unknown date

K
 Karin Krog
 Huskonsert I Aurskog – Musikk Av Og Etter Anders Heyerdahl (Meantime Records)

Deaths

 March
 14 – Maj Sønstevold, composer, pianist, and music teacher (born 1917).

 June
 5 – Anne-Marie Ørbeck, classical pianist and composer (born 1911).

 October
 9 – Per Asplin, pianist, singer, composer and actor (born 1928).
 29 – Robert Levin, classical pianist and composer (born 1912).

 November
 5 – Arne Hendriksen, operatic tenor (born 1911).

Births

 January
 29 – Nora Foss al-Jabri, singer.

 June
 15 – Aurora (Aksnes), singer and songwriter.

 September
 5 – Sigrid (Solbakk Raabe), singer and songwriter.

 October
 12 – Astrid S(meplass), singer and songwriter.

 November
 4 – Adelén (Rusillo Steen), singer.

See also
 1996 in Norway
 Music of Norway
 Norway in the Eurovision Song Contest 1996

References

 
Norwegian music
Norwegian
Music
1990s in Norwegian music